Luís Miguel Valle Cintra (born 29 April 1949) is a Portuguese actor. He has appeared in more than 60 films since 1970. In 1973 Cintra founded the Teatro da Cornucópia with Jorge Silva Melo.

Selected filmography
 A Ilha dos Amores (1982)
 The Distant Land (1987)
 O Desejado (1987)
 The Cannibals (1988)
 Non, ou a Vã Glória de Mandar (1990)
 Abraham's Valley (1993)
 The Convent (1995)
 Anxiety (1998)
 The Letter (1999)
 As Bodas de Deus (1999)
 April Captains (2000)
 The Dancer Upstairs (2002)
 The Uncertainty Principle (2002)
 Daqui P'rá Frente (2007)
 From Now On (2008)
 The Strange Case of Angelica (2010)
 Gebo et l'Ombre (2012)

References

External links

1949 births
Living people
Portuguese male film actors
Portuguese male television actors
Portuguese male stage actors
Golden Globes (Portugal) winners
Pessoa Prize winners